Muscle tissue engineering is a subset of the general field of tissue engineering, which studies the combined use of cells and scaffolds to design therapeutic tissue implants. The major motivation for muscle tissue engineering is to treat a condition called volumetric muscle loss (VML). VML can be caused by a variety of injuries or diseases, including general trauma, postoperative damage, cancer ablation, congenital defects, and degenerative myopathy. 

Although muscle contains a stem cell population called satellite cells that are capable of regenerating small muscle injuries, muscle damage in VML is so extensive that it overwhelms muscle's natural regenerative capabilities. Currently VML is treated through an autologous muscle flap or graft but there are various problems associated with this procedure. Donor site morbidity, lack of donor tissue, and inadequate vascularization all limit the ability of doctors to adequately treat VML. The field of muscle tissue engineering attempts to address this problem through the design of a functional muscle construct that can be used to treat the damaged muscle instead of harvesting an autologous muscle flap from elsewhere on the patient's body.

Muscle is a naturally aligned organ, with individual muscle fibers packed together into larger units called muscle fascicles. The uniaxial alignment of muscle fibers allows them to simultaneously contract in the same direction and properly propagate force on the bones via the tendons. A major focus of muscle tissue engineering is to create constructs with the functionality of native muscle and ability to contract. To this end, alignment of the tissue engineered construct is extremely important. It has been shown that cells grown on substrates with alignment cues form more robust muscle fibers. Several other design criteria considered in muscle tissue engineering include the scaffold porosity, stiffness, biocompatibility, and degradation timeline. Substrate stiffness should ideally be in the myogenic range, which has been shown to be 10-15 kPa.

Functional analysis of a tissue engineered muscle construct is important to illustrate its potential to help regenerate muscle. A variety of assays are generally used to evaluate a tissue engineered muscle construct including immunohistochemistry, RT-PCR, electrical stimulation and resulting peak-to-peak voltage, scanning electron microscope imaging, and in vivo response.

References

Tissue engineering